TVB Music Limited is a CD production limited of TVB.  TVB Music Limited established at 22 March 2004. Mainly, their business including product TVB's music product, held the concert and the singer' s contract.

TVB Themesongs

Hong Kong record labels
TVB